The Thunder Bay North Stars are a junior A ice hockey team from Thunder Bay, Ontario, Canada. They are a member of the Superior International Junior Hockey League.

History
After the fall of the Thunder Bay Flyers in 2001, the Superior International Junior Hockey League (SIJHL) was founded. The Thunder Bay Wolves, who had played for a short while in the Thunder Bay Junior B Hockey League, were a founding team, but after one season they changed their name to the Fort William Wolves. Fort William is one of the original names of the city of Thunder Bay. After two rather average seasons, the team rebranded as the North Stars. The team won both the regular season and the playoff titles from 2004 through 2006.

Their first trip to the Dudley Hewitt Cup Central Canadian Championship in 2004 saw them finish in third place. In the round-robin, the Stars lost to the North Bay Skyhawks of the Northern Ontario Junior Hockey League (NOJHL) 5–4, lost again to the Ontario Provincial Junior A Hockey League (OPJHL)'s Aurora Tigers 4–0, and defeated the NOJHL's Soo Thunderbirds 7–4 to make the semifinal. In the semifinal, the Stars were defeated by the North Bay Skyhawks for the second time in the tournament, losing 3–2.

In their second Dudley Hewitt Cup in 2005, the North Stars finished second in the round-robin, defeating the OPJHL's St. Michael's Buzzers 6–4, losing to the host OPJHL Georgetown Raiders 4–0, and then beating the North Bay Skyhawks 8–2. The semifinal was a rematch with the Buzzers, who avenged their previous loss with a 6–2 victory.

After winning their third straight of league championship in 2006, the Stars competed in their third straight Dudley Hewitt Cup, which they had already qualified for after being selected as the host team. Going into the playoffs, the Stars finished the regular season with a 50–2–0–0 record and the best in the entire Canadian Junior A Hockey League. The Stars took out the K&A Golden Hawks four games to none and then swept the Dryden Ice Dogs in the four-game final for league title. Hosting the 2006 event, the team beat up the NOJHL's Sudbury Jr. Wolves 6–1, but were then defeated by the tournament favourite St. Michael's Buzzers 7–1. In the final round-robin game, the Stars played the SIJHL runner-up Dryden Ice Dogs and beat them 3–0. Fort William and Sudbury both finished with 2–1 records, but the Stars received a bye to the championship game via tiebreaker. Sudbury then defeated Dryden 5–4 in the semifinal to face the North Stars again in the championship. The Stars and Wolves were tied 6–6 at the end of regulation time. The Stars scored quickly in overtime to win their first Dudley Hewitt Cup and a berth in the 2006 Royal Bank Cup national championship. The North Stars were the first team in SIJHL history to have ever won the Dudley Hewitt Cup or play in the Royal Bank Cup.

The Stars began their first Royal Bank Cup with a loss to the host OPJHL Streetsville Derbys 3–2. The second game saw them defeat the Quebec Junior AAA Hockey League's Joliette Action 4–3 in overtime. In the third game, the British Columbia Hockey League's Burnaby Express beat them 3–2. The Stars defeated the Saskatchewan Junior Hockey League's Yorkton Terriers in a 2–1 victory to advance to a semifinal game. Up 2–0 with less than two minutes to go in the semifinal against the Burnaby Express, the Express scored two quick goals to send the game into overtime. Roughly a minute into the overtime, the Express eliminated the North Stars.

For the 2007–08 season, the North Stars switched to a black, silver, and white colour scheme as opposed to their traditional green, yellow, black, and white.

In October 2010, the North Stars were sold to a new ownership group, led by Doug Gunsinger. The team name was changed to the Thunder Bay North Stars. In 2015, the team ownership was sold to Scott and Kris Kellaway.

Season-by-season results

Dudley Hewitt Cup
Central Canada Jr. A ChampionshipsNOJHL – OJHL – SIJHL – HostRound-robin play with 2nd vs. 3rd in semifinal to advance against 1st in the championship game.

Royal Bank Cup
Canadian Jr. A National ChampionshipsDudley Hewitt Champions – Central, Fred Page Champions – Eastern, Doyle Cup Champion – Pacific, ANAVET Cup Champion – Western, and HostRound-robin play with top four in semifinal games and winners to Championship.

Notable alumni
Robert Bortuzzo (2005–2006)
Carter Hutton (2003–2006)

References

External links
Thunder Bay North Stars website

Superior International Junior Hockey League teams
Ice hockey teams in Ontario
Sport in Thunder Bay
2000 establishments in Ontario
Ice hockey clubs established in 2000